Lidiya Hrebets (born 11 April 1943) is a Ukrainian former freestyle swimmer. She competed in three events at the 1968 Summer Olympics for the Soviet Union.

References

External links
 

1943 births
Living people
Ukrainian female freestyle swimmers
Olympic swimmers of the Soviet Union
Swimmers at the 1968 Summer Olympics
Sportspeople from Poltava
Soviet female freestyle swimmers